The Barindji, also written Parrintyi, are an indigenous Australian people of the state of New South Wales.  They are to be distinguished from the Paaruntyi, who spoke a similar language but whom they called the spitting people.

Name
Parrintyi, according to one theory, meant forest dwellers in the local languages, but another view suggests it may have originated from the toponym for a creek known as the Paroo, reflecting prior tribal links.

Tindale glosses this attribution by suggesting that the term may derive from a creek name, called the Paroo, reflecting prior tribal links. An exonym, mamba (devils) was once used by the Darling River aborigines, who were terrified of the Parrintyi.

Country

Their land consisted of large stretches of mallee, mulga, swamp and sand land running parallel to, and east of, the Darling River. Tindale set their southern boundaries from Moira to within  of Euston, and their eastern extension in the vicinity of Ivanhoe. To their west, he added, they took in Manara Range Albermarle, Carowra, Kilfera, Manfred and Willandra Lakes.

Running clockwise from the north, their neighbours were the Naualko, followed by the Ngiyambaa to their east, the Yitayita on their southeastern flank, while the southern Paakantyi inhabited the land to their west.

Social organization
The Parrintyi were organized into clans (hordes) of which the following eight are known:
 Lagerung
 Murro
 Milparo
 Boanjilla
 Pularli
 Nielyi-gulli
 Kurlkgulli
 Karndukul

Traditional Culture
Their water often was obtained from the roots of water mallee (Eucalyptus) trees and Hakea, hence their camping places were widely dispersed and often were casual. Some of the neighbours had more disparaging names for them. The Barindji, living in dry country, extracted water from hakea and mallee. In periods of drought, they would resort, in large mobs, to riverine areas in other tribal lands, engendering fear among, and conflict with, the riverine tribal groups.

Their burial practices are similar to the very ancient burials at nearby Mungo Lake indicating a long time in the area. The Parrintyi were described by Thomas Mitchell and Charles Sturt on their respective explorations of the area and described in colonial times by local landowners A.L.P. Cameron and Alfred William Howitt.

Alternative names
 Barrengee
 Beriait, Berri-ait
 Paru, Paroo
 Bpaaroo (creek name)
 Bpaa'roon-jee
 Bpaaroo (Darling River creek name, not the Paroo River)
 Bpaa'roon-jee (reflects exonym for the Barindji used by the Maraura)

Notes

Citations

Sources

Aboriginal peoples of New South Wales